Bohanna is a surname. Notable people with the surname include:

 Quinton Bohanna (born 1999), American football player
 Tara Bohanna (born 1995), Australian rules footballer

See also
 Bohannan